Roland Egerton may refer to:

Rowland Egerton-Warburton
Sir Roland Egerton, 1st Baronet